GO-64! was an early software emulation of the Commodore 64 computer, with a copyright date of 1988 for version 2.0.

The name most likely comes from the ability for the Commodore 128 computer to switch to a hardware emulation of the Commodore 64 by typing GO64 at the BASIC prompt and pressing the return key.

This software was created by Christopher P. Zura and Cliff Dugan of Software Insight Systems Inc.

It allowed the use of some software and hardware designed for Commodore 64 computers on Amiga computers.

It required a minimum of 512kb of RAM to operate, but 1024kb of RAM was required to make use of all features.  If a 68020 CPU was installed, it could operate at speeds exceeding the speed of a real Commodore 64, according to the developers.

This software does not operate on versions later than 1.3 of the Amiga Kickstart, and so does not operate on the Amiga 3000, Amiga 500 plus, Amiga 600, Amiga 4000 or Amiga 1200.

Amiga emulation software
Commodore 64 emulators